Three-time defending champion Novak Djokovic defeated Nick Kyrgios in the final, 4–6, 6–3, 6–4, 7–6(7–3) to win the gentlemen's singles tennis title at the 2022 Wimbledon Championships. It was his seventh Wimbledon title and 21st major singles title overall. Djokovic became the fifth man in the Open Era to record a streak of at least four consecutive titles at one major. By reaching his 32nd men's singles major final, he surpassed the all-time record he had jointly held with Roger Federer. Djokovic also became the first player (male or female) to win 80 matches at all four majors with his first-round win over Kwon Soon-woo. Because no ranking points were awarded for the tournament in response to its banning of Russian and Belarusian players, Djokovic dropped out of the top five in ATP rankings after the tournament.

Kyrgios became the first unseeded man to reach a major final since Jo-Wilfried Tsonga at the 2008 Australian Open, the first Australian man to reach a major final since Lleyton Hewitt at the 2005 Australian Open, and the first unseeded or Australian man to reach the Wimbledon final since Mark Philippoussis in 2003.

Rafael Nadal was attempting to complete the first three components of a Grand Slam, but withdrew before his scheduled semi-final match against Kyrgios due to a torn abdominal muscle. It was the first time a man had withdrawn from Wimbledon before a semi-final or final since Frank Shields in 1931. Cameron Norrie became the fourth British man in the Open Era (after Roger Taylor, Tim Henman, and Andy Murray) to reach the semi-finals. It was the first time two left-handed men (Norrie and Nadal) had reached the semi-finals since John McEnroe and Goran Ivanišević in 1992, and to the semi-finals of any major since Nadal and Jürgen Melzer at the 2010 French Open.

This was the first edition of Wimbledon to feature a champions tie-break (10-point tie-break), when the score reaches six games all in the fifth set, and the third edition to feature a final set tie-break. Alejandro Davidovich Fokina defeated Hubert Hurkacz in the first round in the first main-draw 10-point tie-break at Wimbledon. It was also the first Wimbledon since the introduction of the ATP rankings in 1973, and the first major since the 1999 Australian Open, where both the reigning world No. 1 and No. 2 (Daniil Medvedev and Alexander Zverev, respectively) did not compete. Medvedev was prohibited from playing due to his Russian nationality, while Zverev had an ankle injury. This marked the first edition of Wimbledon since 1998 not to feature record eight-time champion Roger Federer, resulting he dropped out of the ATP rankings for the first time since 1998. Feliciano López made his 81st main-draw major appearance, tying Federer's all-time record. John Isner broke Ivo Karlović's world record of 13,728 career aces on the ATP Tour in his third-round match against Jannik Sinner.

Seeds
All seeds per ATP rankings.

Draw

Finals

Top half

Section 1

Section 2

Section 3

Section 4

Bottom half

Section 5

Section 6

Section 7

Section 8

Seeded players
The following are the seeded players. Seedings are based on ATP rankings as of 20 June 2022. Rankings and points are as before 27 June 2022.

As a result of special ranking adjustment rules due to the COVID-19 pandemic, players are defending the higher of (i) their points from the 2021 tournament or (ii) the remaining 50% of their points from the 2019 tournament. Those points were not mandatory and are included in the table below only if they counted towards the player's ranking as of 27 June 2022. Note that this is a different rankings adjustment system than the one that the WTA is using for the women's tournament.

The ATP is removing ranking points from the 2022 tournament as a result of the All England Club's decision to ban Russian and Belarusian players from the tournament. Points dropping from the 2021 or 2019 tournaments will accordingly be replaced by the player's next best result, regardless of his performance at Wimbledon in 2022.

† This column shows the higher of the player's points from the 2021 tournament or 50% of his points from the 2019 tournament. Only ranking points counting towards the player's ranking as of 27 June 2022 are reflected in the column.
‡ Because the ATP is removing ranking points from the 2022 tournament, 2021 or 2019 points will be replaced by the player's next best result instead.
§ The player had no points from either the 2021 or 2019 tournaments counting towards his ranking on 27 June 2022. Accordingly, no points will be replaced.

Withdrawn players 
The following players would have been seeded, but withdrew before the tournament began.

Banned players
The following players would have been seeded, but were not permitted to enter the tournament due to the decision to ban players from Russia and Belarus.

Other entry information

Wild cards

Source:

Protected ranking

Qualifiers

Lucky losers

Withdrawals

 The All England Lawn Tennis and Croquet Club declined entries from Russian and Belarusian players to 2022 Wimbledon Championships, stating that "in the circumstances of such unjustified and unprecedented military aggression, it would be unacceptable for the Russian regime to derive any benefits from the involvement of Russian or Belarusian players with The Championships".

The entry list was released based on the ATP rankings for the week of 16 May 2022.

Explanatory notes

References

External links
 Entry List
 Draw
 ITF Preview

Men's Singles
Wimbledon Championships - Men's Singles
2022